Coolaburragundy River, a perennial stream that is part of the Talbragar catchment within the Murray–Darling basin, is located in the Orana district of New South Wales, Australia.

There is sufficient water for limited irrigated cropping on the fertile alluvial soils along the valley. Although the river itself is usually dry, an aquifer lies below the Coolaburragundy valley between Coolah and Dunedoo.

The Craboon-Coolah branch off the Gwabegar railway line, closed in c. 1982, ran close to the Coolaburragundy River throughout its length.

See also

List of rivers of Australia
Rivers of New South Wales

References

External links
 

Rivers of New South Wales
Murray-Darling basin